Bernard Moraly (born 19 June 1957) is a French former professional football player and manager. As a player, he was a defensive midfielder.

After football 
From 1991 to 1999, Moraly worked for Derosier Sport, a company in Grenoble. He was in the commercial department. From 1999 to 2003, he was the organizer of Stages Planète sports courses in Lans-en-Vercors. Starting in 2003, he held the same job in the town of Ruoms. He stopped working for Stages Planète in 2015.

References

External links 
 
 

1957 births
Living people
Footballers from Algiers
Pieds-Noirs
French footballers
Algerian people of French descent
Algerian footballers
Association football midfielders
Stade Saint-Germain players
Paris Saint-Germain F.C. players
Paris FC players
Grenoble Foot 38 players
CO Saint-Dizier players
CS Sedan Ardennes players
Ligue 1 players
Ligue 2 players
French Division 3 (1971–1993) players
French Division 4 (1978–1993) players
21st-century Algerian people